Gracie Dzienny (born August 26, 1995) is an American actress. She is known for her roles as Amanda McKay on Nickelodeon's Supah Ninjas, as Greer Danville on ABC Family's Chasing Life, and as Clementine Lewis on CBS' Zoo.

Early life
Dzienny is from Toledo, Ohio, and is the daughter of Mike and Tara Dzienny. She is the youngest of three children. Dzienny began modeling at the age of five after winning a contest sponsored by L'Oréal, and primarily modeled during summers. Soon after taking up modeling she began studying tap, jazz, ballet, and hip hop dancing. After landing a role in the Supah Ninjas pilot, Dzienny and her mother moved to Los Angeles in November 2010.

Her Supah Ninjas co-star George Takei stated in an interview that Dzienny is a "musical theater fan".

Career
During her freshman year in high school Dzienny auditioned for the part of Amanda on Supah Ninjas, a process that involved approximately half a dozen subsequent auditions.

In 2014 Dzienny began appearing in the ABC Family drama series Chasing Life playing Greer Danville, the love interest of the lead character's younger sister, Brenna (Haley Ramm). In December 2016 she was promoted to a starring role in the third season of the CBS drama series Zoo. In 2017, she joined the cast of the film Bumblebee. In 2021, Dzienny played the supporting role of Ruby Red in the Netflix superhero series Jupiter's Legacy. In May 2021, she was cast in the regular role of the vampire Elinor Fairmont in the Netflix vampire drama series First Kill.

Filmography

References

External links

 
 

1995 births
Living people
Actresses from Toledo, Ohio
American television actresses
American child actresses
21st-century American actresses